Ambry Moss (born November 2, 1990) is a soccer player who played college soccer for the Northeastern Huskies and internationally for the Bahamas national team.

References

1990 births
Living people
Bahamian footballers
Bahamas international footballers
Association football defenders
Northeastern Huskies men's soccer players
Bahamian expatriates in the United States